Shah Mohammad Qasemi (also Romanized as Shāh Moḩammad Qāsemī; also known as Deh-e Shāh Moḩammad Qāsemī, Deh-e Shāh Moḩammad, Ḩājjī Shāh Moḩammad, and Shāh Moḩammad) is a village in Margan Rural District, in the Central District of Hirmand County, Sistan and Baluchestan Province, Iran. At the 2006 census, its population was 136, in 31 families.

References 

Populated places in Hirmand County